Opisthopatus laevis is a species of velvet worm in the Peripatopsidae family. This species has 16 pairs of legs. The type locality is in South Africa. The validity of this species is uncertain: Some authorities consider O. laevis invalid even as a subspecies of O. cinctipes, a similar species also found in South Africa, but other authorities recognize O. laevis as a separate species, citing the significant distance (570 km) between the type localities of these two species.

References

Endemic fauna of South Africa
Onychophorans of temperate Africa
Onychophoran species
Animals described in 1947